Raynald Denoueix (born 14 May 1948) is a French football manager and former defender.

Born in Rouen, Denoueix spent his whole playing career as a defender at FC Nantes before becoming a coach at the club's youth academy. During his time at the youth academy, he discovered players such as Didier Deschamps or Marcel Desailly. After Jean-Claude Suaudeau's retirement, he became the first team coach and won the Division 1 in the 2000–01 season. He was sacked the following season due to unsatisfying results in Ligue 1. In 2002, he was signed by the Real Sociedad and led the Spanish team to the second place in La Liga in the 2002–03 season.

Honours

Player
Nantes
Division 1: 1972–73, 1976–77
Coupe de France: 1978–79

Manager
Nantes
Division 1: 2000–01
Coupe de France: 1998–99, 1999–2000
Trophée des Champions: 1999, 2001

Individual
French Division 1 Manager of the Year: 2000–01
Don Balón Award – La Liga Coach of the Year: 2002–03

References

External links
 Stats on Real Sociedad official site

Living people
1948 births
French footballers
Footballers from Rouen
Association football defenders
Ligue 1 players
FC Nantes players
Ligue 1 managers
French football managers
FC Nantes managers
La Liga managers
Real Sociedad managers
French expatriate football managers
French expatriate sportspeople in Spain
Expatriate football managers in Spain